Henry Chase was a member of the Wisconsin State Assembly during the 1868 session. A Republican, he represented the 2nd District of Vernon County, Wisconsin. Chaseburg, Wisconsin was named after him. Chase died on March 25, 1871.

References

External links

People from Vernon County, Wisconsin
Republican Party members of the Wisconsin State Assembly
1871 deaths
Burials in Wisconsin
Year of birth missing